Boldyrevo is a rural locality (a selo) in Bolshemogoysky Selsoviet of Volodarsky District, Astrakhan Oblast, Russia. The population was 557 as of 2010. There are 4 streets.

Geography 
It is located on the Kornevaya and Zeleninskaya Rivers, 8 km south of Volodarsky (the district's administrative centre) by road. Meneshau is the nearest rural locality.

References 

Rural localities in Volodarsky District, Astrakhan Oblast